Seuthes may refer to:

 Seuthes I, king of the Odrysian Thracians from 424 BC until 410 BC.
 Seuthes II, king of the Odrysian kingdom of Thrace, from about 405 BC–391 BC.
 Seuthes III, king of the Odrysian kingdom of Thrace from ca. 330 BC to ca. 300 BC
 Seuthes, a general in the army of Dromichaetes.
 Seuthes, legendary father of Abaris the Hyperborean.